The 2018 season was the Houston Texans' 17th season in the National Football League and their fifth under head coach Bill O'Brien. This marks the first season since 2005 that Rick Smith will not be the general manager as he took a leave of absence for family reasons. Despite an 0–3 start, their first in 10 years, the Texans surpassed their win total from the previous season with a Week 8 win over the Miami Dolphins. They had a franchise record 9 consecutive wins that also broke the NFL record for most consecutive wins after starting 0–3. The streak ended with a Week 14 loss to the Indianapolis Colts. With a Week 15 win over the New York Jets, the Texans clinched their first 10-win season under head coach Bill O’Brien, their first 10-win season since 2012 and their third 10-win season in franchise history.

On November 23, 2018, Bob McNair, the founding owner of the Texans, died aged 81.

Despite losing to the Philadelphia Eagles in Week 16, the Texans clinched a playoff berth after the New Orleans Saints defeated the Pittsburgh Steelers later that day.

With a Week 17 win over the Jacksonville Jaguars, the Texans clinched the AFC South division, winning their fifth division title.

The Texans lost in the Wild Card Round of the playoffs, 21–7 to their AFC South rival, the Indianapolis Colts.

Draft

Draft trades
The Texans traded their first-round selection (4th overall), as well as their 2017 first-round selection (25th overall) to the Cleveland Browns in exchange for Cleveland's first-round selection in 2017 (12th overall).
The Texans traded their second-round selection (35th overall), their sixth-round selection in 2017 (188th overall) and quarterback Brock Osweiler to Cleveland in exchange for Cleveland's fourth-round selection in 2017 (142nd overall).
The Texans traded their fifth-round selection (141st overall) and offensive tackle Duane Brown in exchange for Seattle's third-round selection (80th overall) and a second-round selection in 2019.
The Texans were awarded one third-round and two sixth-round compensatory picks (98th, 211th and 214th overall).

Staff

Final roster

NFL Top 100

Preseason

Regular season

Schedule

Note: Intra-division opponents are in bold text.

Game summaries

Week 1: at New England Patriots

Safety Tyrann Mathieu, who signed with the Texans in the offseason, intercepted a Tom Brady pass that was tipped by Angelo Blackson in the 1st quarter.

Week 2: at Tennessee Titans

Week 3: vs. New York Giants

With the loss, the Texans fell to 0–3 for the first time since 2008, and suffered their ninth consecutive loss dating back to Week 12 of last season. They then went on to win their next nine games.

Week 4: at Indianapolis Colts

Win the win, the Texans improved to 1–3 and snapped a 9–game losing streak. Rookie wide receiver Keke Coutee made his NFL debut, finishing with 11 receptions for 109 yards. Coutee's 11 receptions are the most by a rookie receiver since the AFL–NFL merger.

Week 5: vs. Dallas Cowboys

Week 6: vs. Buffalo Bills
Battle Red Day

In a low-scoring defensive battle, the Texans claimed the victory in final minutes when cornerback Johnathan Joseph intercepted a pass from Bills backup quarterback Nathan Peterman and returned it for the game-winning touchdown.

Week 7: at Jacksonville Jaguars

Lamar Miller had his first 100-yard rushing game since December 11, 2016 and also had his first rushing touchdown of the season on a 5-yard run during the third quarter. Safety Tyrann Mathieu sacked Jacksonville quarterback Cody Kessler in the fourth quarter for his first sack as a Texan and also had an interception. With the win, Houston improved to 4–3, took sole possession of 1st place in the AFC South, and had their first four-game winning streak since the 2015 season.

Week 8: vs. Miami Dolphins

Quarterback Deshaun Watson threw five touchdowns (tying a career high) while only having four incompletions with no interceptions. Lamar Miller had another 100-yard rushing game for the second week in a row, running for 133 yards with a touchdown. With the win, the Texans improved to 5–3 and surpassed their win total from the previous season. Receiver Will Fuller tore his right ACL during the game and is expected to be out for 6 to 9 months.

Week 9: at Denver Broncos

With the close win, the Texans improved to 6–3.  They are the first team since the 1970 Giants to win 6 in a row after starting 0–3.

Week 11: at Washington Redskins

With another close win, the Texans improved to 7–3, their best start since 2012. They also tied their longest win streak in franchise history at 7 straight, which they previously accomplished in 2011. This is the second straight game that the Texans have won thanks to a missed last second field goal.

Week 12: vs. Tennessee Titans

The Texans successfully avenged their Week 2 loss to their division rival Titans. With their 8th straight win, they improved to 8–3 and eclipsed their previous franchise record for most consecutive wins. Coupled with a Steelers loss to the Denver Broncos the day before, the Texans' victory allowed them to leapfrog the Steelers for the No. 3 seed in the AFC.

This game was the first game following the death of the owner and founder Bob McNair and the team has dedicated the victory to him.

Week 13: vs. Cleveland Browns

The Houston Texans were going for their ninth win in a row against Baker Mayfield and the Cleveland Browns who the week before defeated the Bengals. The Texans were able to outplay the Browns en route to their ninth straight win and forced the Browns to turn the ball over four times including three interceptions by Baker Mayfield.

Week 14: vs. Indianapolis Colts

With the loss, the Texans 9-game winning streak was snapped. They also squandered an opportunity to move ahead of the Patriots for the No. 2 seed as the Patriots suffered a loss of their own to the Miami Dolphins.

Week 15: at New York Jets

With the win, the Texans improved to 10–4 and reached 10 wins for the first time since 2012, and for the first time in the Bill O'Brien era. With the Patriots loss to the Pittsburgh Steelers the next day, the Texans obtained sole possession of the No. 2 seed and now control their destiny for a first-round bye if they win their last 2 games.

Week 16: at Philadelphia Eagles

The Texans traveled to Philadelphia seeking to defeat the Philadelphia Eagles for the first time in franchise history. Houston rallied from a 13-point fourth quarter deficit to take a one-point lead on a 35-yard touchdown reception by Vyncint Smith with 2:04 remaining in the game. However, the defense could not stop Philadelphia on the ensuing drive, and the Eagles prevailed 32-30 on a 35-yard field goal by Jake Elliott as time expired. With the loss, the Texans fell to 10-5 on the season and 0-5 all-time against the Eagles. Houston also failed to clinch the AFC South due to victories by the Tennessee Titans and Indianapolis Colts and slipped back to No. 3 with the New England Patriots victory over the Buffalo Bills. However, the Texans would clinch a playoff berth when the Pittsburgh Steelers lost to the New Orleans Saints later that day.

Week 17: vs. Jacksonville Jaguars

Standings

Division

Conference

Postseason

Schedule

Game summaries

AFC Wild Card Playoffs: vs. (6) Indianapolis Colts

This was the first time in Houston Texans history where they played against a division opponent in the postseason. With the NFC East champion Dallas Cowboys hosting the Seattle Seahawks Saturday evening, it was also the first time in league history that two NFL playoff games were played in Texas on the same day.

Statistics

Team

Individual

Source:

References

External links
 

Houston
Houston Texans seasons
Houston Texans
AFC South championship seasons